Roßla-Südharz was a Verwaltungsgemeinschaft ("collective municipality") in the Mansfeld-Südharz district, in Saxony-Anhalt, Germany. It was situated in the southern part of the Harz, west of Sangerhausen. The seat of the Verwaltungsgemeinschaft was in Roßla. It was disbanded on 1 January 2010.

The Verwaltungsgemeinschaft Roßla-Südharz consisted of the following municipalities (population in 2005 between brackets):

References

Former Verwaltungsgemeinschaften in Saxony-Anhalt